Robert Chaplin  (born January 17, 1968) is a Canadian artist and publisher, currently based in Vancouver. His practice includes carving gem stones, making sculptures, drawing and painting pictures, writing stories, and publishing books. He holds the Guinness World Record for publishing the world's smallest book.

Career
Born in Smithers, British Columbia, Chaplin studied Fine Art at the University of Victoria, and was elected to the Royal Canadian Academy of Arts in 2004.

His obsidian carving representing the North Wind was awarded third place in the Objects of Art category of the 2002 AGTA Cutting Edge Awards.

In 2010 his book Brussels Sprouts & Unicorns was awarded first place in the Alcuin Society Awards for "excellence in book design in Canada".
In 2006 his book Ten Counting Cat was awarded second place in the Alcuin Awards. Teeny Ted from Turnip Town (2007), created in association with nanoscientists at Simon Fraser University in Burnaby, and written by Malcolm Chaplin, is the  world's smallest book, at 69 x 97 micrometres square. Chaplin's other books include Alien Alphabet (1994), The Matchbook-a fireside fable,  Ten Counting Cat, The Elephant Book, Delicious Chicken Soup, and Brussels Sprouts & Unicorns.

References

External links
 Robert Chaplin's blog, with artwork and photos
 
 "As it Happens" CBC Radio interview
 Globe & Mail
 Tri-City News
 "North by Northwest" CBC Radio Interview 
 Huffington Post
 Teeny Ted from Turnip Town review

1968 births
Artists from British Columbia
Canadian sculptors
Canadian male sculptors
Living people
Members of the Royal Canadian Academy of Arts
People from Smithers, British Columbia
University of Victoria alumni